Tales of the Red Caboose was a short-lived primetime television series that aired on the American Broadcasting Company television network, premiering October 29, 1948 and running until January 14, 1949.

Production background
The series was very basic television, consisting of a small children's model trains going around various tracks. It was, in a sense, an early infomercial, as it was sponsored by Lionel Trains. 

The series was a complete failure, resulting in its quick cancellation after less than three months. The narrator, Don Magee, would tell stories about trains to accompany the visuals. The 15-minute show aired Fridays at 7:30pm ET.

Preservation status
No recordings of the program are known to survive.

See also
The Roar of the Rails
The Magic Clown
1948-49 United States network television schedule

References

External links
 Tales of the Red Caboose at IMDB

Black-and-white American television shows
American children's adventure television series
1948 American television series debuts
1949 American television series endings
American Broadcasting Company original programming
Television series about rail transport
Toy trains